The 1997 Cal Poly Mustangs football team represented California Polytechnic State University as an independent during the 1997 NCAA Division I-AA football season. Led by first-year head coach Larry Welsh, Cal Poly compiled a record of 10–1. The Mustangs played home games at Mustang Stadium in San Luis Obispo, California Overall, the team outscored its opponents 382–213 for the season.

Schedule

Team players in the NFL
The following Cal Poly Mustang players were selected in the 1998 NFL Draft.

References

Cal Poly
Cal Poly Mustangs football seasons
Cal Poly Mustangs football